"Reflected" is a song by American rock band Alice Cooper, released in 1969 as the first single from their debut album Pretties for You. 

The band also performed the song during a party scene in the film Diary of a Mad Housewife (1970).

The single was issued twice; both on 7-inch vinyl. Its first release was on May 19, 1969, preceding the album Pretties for You which was released on June 25.

It featured a B-Side, "Living", which also appeared on the Pretties for You album.

The song was later reworked as "Elected", which appeared on their 1973 album Billion Dollar Babies.

Track listing
"Reflected" – 3:17
"Living" - 3:12

Releases on Albums
"Pretties for You"
"School Days: The Early Recordings"
"The Life and Crimes of Alice Cooper"

Personnel
Alice Cooper – vocals, harmonica
Glen Buxton – lead guitar
Michael Bruce – rhythm guitar, backing vocals
Dennis Dunaway – bass guitar
Neal Smith – drums

References  

Alice Cooper songs
1969 debut singles
Songs written by Alice Cooper
Songs written by Dennis Dunaway
1969 songs
American psychedelic rock songs